Sahdev is an Indian name. Notable people with the name include:

 Gireesh Sahdev, Indian actor
 Nakul Sahdev, actor
 Piyush Sahdev, Indian actor
 Sahdev Prasad Yadav, Indian politician
 Sahdev Singh Pundir, Indian politician
 Vaishali Sahdev, birth name of Indian actress Meher Vij